Paul Jeremy Hemmings is an English musician and photographer. He composed the theme song for the BBC soap opera Doctors.

Career
In 2000, Hemmings composed the theme song for the BBC daytime soap opera Doctors.

Hemmings played with The La's, Mike Badger and The Onset and Ian Broudie and the Lightning Seeds. He is also a partner in Liverpool's independent Viper Label.

Hemmings' current project is called The Floatation Project. Their debut album Sonic Stories was called "understated splendour" by Mojo magazine in May 2005, whilst Uncut said "Guitarist Paul Hemmings can shine from other angles".

The second album Sounds From The Solar System released in October 2006, was called "fascinating, unsettling and unique" by Rough Trade Records.

Associated acts
 The La's (1987)
 The Onset (1987–1991)
 The Lightning Seeds (1994–1998)
 The Floatation Project (2005–present)

Solo discography
Studio albums (as The Floatation Project)
 Sonic Stories (2005)
 Sounds from the Solar System (2006)
 Made out of Worldly Shapes (2011)
 Late Night Blue (2011)

Session discography
 The La's – "Way Out" (1987)
 The Onset – The Pool of Life (1988)
 The Membranes – Kiss Ass Godhead! (1988)
 Neuro – The Electric Mothers of Invention (1993)
 Sensuround – "When I Get to Heaven" (1993)
 Mike Badger – Volume (1999)
 Mike Badger – Double Zero (2000)
 Steve Roberts – It Just Is (2001)
 The La's – Lost La's 1986–1987: Callin' All (2001)
 Aviator – Huxley Pig Part 1 (2002)
 Otaku No Denki – The Future Played Backwards (2003)
 Chris Elliot – Fierce Truth and Fortune (2007)
 Mike Badger – Rogue State (2011)
 Space - "Blow Up Doll" (2016)
 Space - Give Me Your Future (2017)
 The Thomas Scott Quintet - Marionette (2020)

References

External links
 The Viper Label official website
 Paul Hemmings on Myspace
 The Floatation Project on Myspace
 
 

Year of birth missing (living people)
Living people
English rock guitarists
Photographers from Liverpool
Musicians from Liverpool
The La's members
The Lightning Seeds members
The Viper Label artists